Are You From Dixie ('Cause I'm from Dixie Too) is a song written by lyricist Jack Yellen and composer George L. Cobb, who teamed up to create several Vaudeville-era songs celebrating the American South. It was originally recorded by Billy Murray in 1916.

The song has been covered by many pop and country artists. One of the most successful recordings was by American country music artist Jerry Reed. His version was released in August 1969 as the only single from his album, Jerry Reed Explores Guitar Country. The song reached a peak of #11 on the U.S. Billboard Hot Country Singles chart.

The song is part of tradition at the University of Southern Mississippi. It is regularly played as a part of the Pride of Mississippi Marching Band's repertoire, being played after every extra point in a Southern Miss Golden Eagles football game.

Chart performance

Other versions
Joe Bennett and the Sparkletones released a version of the song as a single in 1960.
Grandpa Jones recorded his version in 1965.

References

1915 songs
1969 singles
Songs written by Jack Yellen
Songs with music by George L. Cobb
Jerry Reed songs
The Sparkletones songs
Song recordings produced by Chet Atkins
Songs about the American South